The Museo Nacional de San Carlos is a Mexican national art museum devoted to European art, located in the Cuauhtémoc borough in Mexico City. The museum is housed in the Palace of the Count of Buenavista, a neoclassical building at Puente de Alvarado No. 50, Colonia Tabacalera, Mexico City. It contains works by Lucas Cranach the Elder, Parmigianino, Frans Hals, Anthony van Dyck, Jean-Auguste-Dominique Ingres, Auguste Rodin and other well-known European painters and sculptors.

The institution

The museum was founded in 1968 by the Instituto Nacional de Bellas Artes y Literatura to house the collection of European art.

Directors
1997 - 2004: Roxana Velásquez Martínez del Campo
... - 2011: Maria Fernanda Matos Moctezuma
2011 - ...: Carmen Gaitán

The collection

Paintings

Sculptures
James Pradier, Bacchante
Auguste Rodin, The call to arms
Miguel E. Schulz, Diana
Manuel Vilar, Charles Borromeo

Other
Flemish tapestry Battle, from the 17th century

See also
List of colonial non-religious buildings in Mexico City

References

San Carlos
San Carlos
San Carlos
Landmarks in Mexico City
Architecture in Mexico
Neoclassical architecture in Mexico
Mexican art
San Carlos
1968 establishments in Mexico